Wiesing is a municipality in the Schwaz district in the Austrian state of Tyrol.

Wiesing may also refer to:
, a subdivision (Ortsteil) in Altenthann municipality, Germany
, Germany
, German philosopher
The original German spelling of the surname of Vadim G. Vizing, a Soviet Ukrainian mathematician

See also
Wiesinger (surname)